The Replace Sinema Project, formerly known as Primary Sinema Project and Primary Sinema PAC, is a political fundraising and advocacy initiative in the United States dedicated to defeating U.S. Senator Kyrsten Sinema (I-AZ) in the 2024 election.

The project is an initiative of Change for Arizona 2024 PAC, which is dedicated to electing Democratic Senators and Representatives in 2024.

Mission and rationale 

Because the Democratic Party won only a slim majority in the 2020 U.S. Senate elections, enacting signature policy initiatives of the Democratic Party and the Biden administration has required either concurrence of all of the Democratic and Democratic-caucusing Senators, or the support of some Republican Senators. Due to Senate rules permitting the filibuster, a tactic employed on the floor of the Senate to prevent passage of legislation, some bills require a 60-vote supermajority for passage.

Policy initiatives such as the Biden administration's Build Back Better Act, the Bipartisan Infrastructure Bill, the John Lewis Voting Rights Act, and Women's Health Protection Act were delayed, watered down, or abandoned in the 117th Congress due to a lack of majority support in the Senate. In many cases, the Senators who have declined to support priorities of the Biden administration are Sinema and Joe Manchin.

Some Democrats have advocated for the elimination of the filibuster so that all legislation in the Senate can be passed by a simple majority, which in some cases would enable legislation to pass even without the support of Sinema. But that, too, would require a majority, and Sinema has repeatedly stated that she objects to eliminating the filibuster. On January 13, 2022, she said, "I will not support separate actions that worsen the underlying disease of division infecting our country."

A range of Democratic-aligned political advocacy organizations have been raising money to fund a primary challenger to Sinema since 2021.

Following Sinema's party switch from Democrat to Independent, the Project switched its name from the "Primary Sinema Project" to the "Replace Sinema Project", vowing to support a Democratic candidate in the 2024 general election, should Sinema attempt to run under her new label.

Funding and spending 

In January 15, 2022, the Replace Sinema Project reported that it has raised $250,000 since it launched at the end of September 2021, along with  $400,000 in seed money from the progressive donor group Way to Win.

The Replace Sinema Project has said that the funds it raises will not go to a specific candidate, but rather "will go to support grassroots groups on the ground in Arizona who are leading the fight to hold Sinema accountable." U.S. Representative Ruben Gallego is a heavily speculated contender to challenge Sinema.

According to data released by the U.S. Federal Election Commission on January 15, 2022, Change for Arizona 2024 PAC had made $110,000 in expenditures for or against candidates so far in the 2022 U.S. federal election cycle.

References

External links 
 Official website of the Replace Sinema Project
 Official website of Way to Win
United States political action committees
501(c)(4) nonprofit organizations